WWGN is a religious formatted radio station broadcasting on 88.9 FM. The station is licensed to Ottawa, Illinois, and serving the areas of LaSalle, Illinois, Peru, Illinois, Ottawa, Illinois, and Streator, Illinois.  WWGN is owned and operated by Family Worship Center Church, Inc.

History
The station began broadcasting on September 24, 1994, and was owned by Cornerstone Community Radio, airing a religious format. In 1999, the station was sold to American Family Association for $250,000, and it became an affiliate of American Family Radio. In 2004, the station was sold to Family Worship Center Church, along with WAWF and WBMF, for $1 million.

References

External links
 

Radio stations established in 1994
1994 establishments in Illinois
WGN